Part 1 may refer to:
Part 1 (Twin Peaks), the first episode of the third season of the TV series Twin Peaks
Part 1 (EP), a 2016 EP by Guy Sebastian
Part 1, a 2017 EP by O-Town. See O-Town discography

See also
 PART1, also known as Prostate androgen-regulated transcript 1, a long non-coding RNA